List of Administrative Heads of Australian Antarctic Territory

Directors of the Australian Antarctic Division (part of the Australian Department of Environment and Heritage)

Lists of office-holders in Australia
Government of Australia
Australian Antarctic Territory
People of Antarctica
Lists of Australian public servants
Antarctica-related lists